Kim Jae-heon (born 26 July 1996) is a South Korean professional footballer who plays as a midfielder for Gyeongju KHNP.

Career
Kim joined Portsmouth in 2012, completing a two-year scholarship with the youth team before being released in 2014. Kim joined the FAB Academy based at the National Sports Centre before joining the Nike Academy where he was awarded Player of the Year for the 2015/16 season. In 2016, he spent time on trial at Charlton Athletic and Bristol Rovers. 

After a one year absence from football, Kim went back to his native South Korea and joined Seoul Nowon United of the K3 League Basic ahead of the 2018 season. The following year, he joined fellow K3 League Basic side, Yeoju FC.

In July 2019, Kim joined Gangwon FC of K League 1, however left at the end of the season without making an appearance for the club.

Kim joined Suwon FC ahead of the 2020 K League 2 campaign. On 6 June 2020, he scored his first two goals for the club during the 10-0 victory over Hyochang FC in the 2020 Korean FA Cup second-round. At the end of the season, Suwon gained promotion to K League 1 after finishing as runners-up.

In July 2021, Kim joined K League 2 side Chungnam Asan on a permanent deal. He made his debut on 8 June in the 0-0 away draw with Busan IPark. After making 6 appearances, Kim left the club at the end of the season and is currently a free-agent.

Career statistics

References

External links
 
 Kim Jae-heon at playmakerstats.com

South Korean footballers
South Korean expatriate sportspeople in England
K League 2 players
Living people
1996 births
Expatriate footballers in England
Association football midfielders
Suwon FC players
South Korean expatriate footballers
Footballers from Seoul